The Wahhabist sack of Karbala occurred on 21April 1802 (1216 H), under the rule of Abdulaziz bin Muhammad the second ruler of the First Saudi State. Approximately 12,000 Wahhabists from Najd attacked the city of Karbala. The raid was conducted in retaliation against attacks on Hajj caravans by Iraqi tribes and coincided with the anniversary of Ghadir Khum event, or 10thMuharram.

Wahhabists killed 2,0005,000 of the inhabitants and plundered the tomb of Husayn ibn Ali, grandson of the Islamic prophet Muhammad and son of Ali ibn Abi Talib, and destroyed its dome, seizing a large quantity of spoils, including gold, Persian carpets, money, pearls, and guns that had accumulated in the tomb, most of them donations. The attack lasted for eight hours, after which the Wahhabists left the city with more than 4,000 camels carrying their plunder.

Background

Following the teachings of Ibn Taymiyya, the Wahhabis "sought to return to the fundamentals of the tradition – the Quran, the Sunna, and the Hanbali school's legal positions." They condemned some of the Shia practices such as veneration of the graves of their holy figures and Imams, which they called Bid‘ah, and did not limit themselves to academic confrontation. According to the French orientalist Jean-Baptiste Rousseau, it was also very well known that some of the Shia tombs of Karbala were repositories of "incredible wealth", accumulated over centuries.

The Turkish Deputy of Mecca had concluded an agreement with the Emirate of Diriyah which ensured the safety of Hajj pilgrims. However, in a bid to disrupt the Ottoman-Saudi treaty, Iraqi tribesmen were ordered to attack the caravans. In retaliation, 'Abd al-Azeez launched a major offensive and by April 1801 the Saudi armies had reached Karbala.

Event

Date of attack
Most European and Russian orientalists date the attack to March 1801, based on works by Rousseau, Corancez, Burckhardt, and Mengin. Arab historians and St John Philby date the fall of Karbala to March – April 1802, based on Ibn Bishr's report of the event. The reports dating the attack to 1802, written soon after the attack, are accepted by Ibn Sanad and Raymond. Alexei Vassiliev argues that 1802 is correct, pointing out that the "dispatch" sent from Karbala reached the Russian embassy in Istanbul no later than 1803, and as Rousseau's book describing the attack is almost identical in wording with the text of the dispatch with the exception of accounted dates, the error could be due simply to "negligence" by the author, Rousseau, or the compositor.

Attack
On 18 Dhu al-Hijjah, coincident with the anniversary of Ghadir Khum, (or on 10Muharram coincident with the anniversary of Husayn ibn Ali's death) Wahhabis of the Najd led by Abdulaziz bin Muhammads son, Saud, attacked Karbala. The Ottoman garrison escaped, and the Wahhabis were left free to loot the city and the shrine and kill 2,0005,000 people.

Describing the event as "a horrible example of Wahhabis' cruel fanaticism in the terrible fate of [mosque of] Imam Husayn," Rousseau, who was residing in Iraq at the time, wrote that an incredible amount of wealth, including donations of silver, gold, and jewels to Husayn ibn Ali's shrine and those brought by Nadir Shah from his India campaign, was known to have been gathered in the city of Karbala. According to Rousseau, 12,000 Wahhabis attacked the city, set fire to everything, and killed old people, women, and children. "... when ever they saw a pregnant woman, they disembowelled her and left the foetus on the mother's bleeding corpse," said Rousseau.

According to a Wahhabi chronicler, Uthman ibn Abdullah ibn Bishr:

Wahhabis such as Ibn Bishr referred to themselves simply as 'Muslims', since they believed that they were the true Muslims.

The leader of the attack, Saud bin Abdulaziz bin Muhammad bin Saud, has been known as the 'butcher of Karbala' since then. The plunder of Karbala took the Wahhabis almost eight hours, according to Mengin. Fath-Ali Shah of Iran offered military help, which was rejected by the Ottomans, and instead he sent "500 Baluchi families to settle in Karbala and defend it."

Aftermath
The fall of Karbala was counted as a defeat for Buyuk Sulayman Pasha, creating an opportunity for the Ottoman sultan to "dismiss him", especially because his situation was further weakened after he was criticized by the Shah of Persia, Fath Ali Shah, for his inability to confront the Wahhabis.

The attack exposed the lack of a Shia "army" to mobilize against such attacks. It also led to a strengthening of the "sectarian identity" of Shia ulama (i.e. scholars). The sack horrified the "Sunni scholarly establishment", but its aftermath also gave fundamentalism a degree of intellectual credibility in the Sunni literary salons of Baghdad, further heightening sectarian tensions. Saudi ruler Abd al-Azeez would soon be assassinated in a revenge attack. Following 'Abd al-Azeez's death, further Wahhabi advances within Iraq were halted.

See also
 Demolition of al-Baqi
 Emirate of Nejd
 Wahhabi War

References

1802 in the Ottoman Empire
1802 murders in the Ottoman Empire
1802 disasters in the Ottoman Empire
1802 in Asia
April 1802 events
Attacks on religious buildings and structures in Iraq
Attacks on Shiite mosques
Conflicts in 1802
Battles involving Iraq
Battles involving the Ottoman Empire
Battles involving Saudi Arabia
Karbala
Looting
Shia–Sunni relations
Shia–Sunni sectarian violence
Wahhabism